Acritus komai is a species of clown beetles in the family Histeridae. It is found in Africa, Australia, Europe and Northern Asia (excluding China), North America, Oceania, and Southern Asia.

References

 Bousquet, Yves, and Serge Laplante (2006). "Coleoptera Histeridae". The Insects and Arachnids of Canada, part 24, xiii + 485.
 Mazur, Slawomir (1997). "A world catalogue of the Histeridae (Coleoptera: Histeroidea)". Genus, International Journal of Invertebrate Taxonomy (Supplement), 373.

Further reading

 Arnett, R. H. Jr., M. C. Thomas, P. E. Skelley and J. H. Frank. (eds.). (21 June 2002). American Beetles, Volume II: Polyphaga: Scarabaeoidea through Curculionoidea. CRC Press LLC, Boca Raton, Florida .
 
 Richard E. White. (1983). Peterson Field Guides: Beetles. Houghton Mifflin Company.

Histeridae
Beetles described in 1879